DSH, Dsh or dsh may refer to:

Biology
Dishevelled (Dsh), a family of proteins 
Domestic shorthaired cat, the house cat
 Deutscher Schäferhund, German for German Shepherd Dog

Health
Deliberate self-harm, a psychological condition involving self-inflicted injuries
Disproportionate share hospital, a U.S. hospital serving an above-average number of low-income patients

Transport
Deep Space Habitat, a proposed NASA design for crew living quarters in exploration of the solar system
Dunmore railway station, New South Wales, Australia, having station code DSH
Dash Air Charter, a U.S. airline having ICAO code DSH, see Airline codes-D

Languages
ISO 639:dsh or Daasanach language, an African language
Dsh (trigraph), a Latin-script representation of an Irish sound

Education
Deutsche Schule Helsinki, a German- and Finnish-speaking school in Helsinki, Finland
Deutsche Schule Hurghada (German School Hurghada)
Deutsche Sprachprüfung für den Hochschulzugang, a German language proficiency test required to study at German higher education institutions

Other
Deep Space Habitat, 2012 NASA concepts for crewed missions
Dick Smith (retailer), ASX code
Dom Sylvester Houédard, an English poet and theologian known as dsh
A track on Spunge (album)
Subsistence Homesteads Division, a 1930s US agency

See also
DSHS (disambiguation)